Downs Glacier is located in Shoshone National Forest, in the U.S. state of Wyoming on the east of the Continental Divide in the Wind River Range. Downs Glacier is one of many glaciers found in the Fitzpatrick Wilderness, and is part of the largest grouping of glaciers in the American Rocky Mountains.

References

See also
 List of glaciers in the United States

Glaciers of Fremont County, Wyoming
Shoshone National Forest
Glaciers of Wyoming